Adina railway station is a railway station on the Malda Town–New Jalpaiguri line of Katihar railway division of Northeast Frontier Railway Zone. It is situated at Gotpara, Adina of Malda district in the Indian state of West Bengal. Total 16 passenger and express trains stop at Adina railway station.

References

Railway stations in Malda district
Katihar railway division